Regulus is one of the brightest stars in the night sky.

Regulus, Latin for little king, may also refer to:

Animals
 Regulus (bird), a bird genus 
 Regulus (horse), a Thoroughbred racehorse and sire
 Basilisk, from the Greek term for regulus
 Kinglet, a small bird in the family Regulidae
 Regulus regulus or Goldcrest, a bird in the family

Fiction
 Regulus (Bomberman), a character in the Bomberman series of video games
 Regulus Black, a fictional character from the Harry Potter series of novels by J. K. Rowling
 Regulus Corneas, a character in the series Re:Zero − Starting Life in Another World
 Demon Regulus, a fallen Angel
 Regulus (Crowne play), a 1692 work by John Crowne
 Regulus (1744 play), a 1744 work by William Havard
 Regulus, a story in Rudyard Kipling's 1899 Stalky & Co. collection
 Leo Regulus, a character from the manga Saint Seiya: The Lost Canvas
 a character from the High School DxD series

Military
 French ship Régulus (1805)
 HMS Regulus, a list of ships with the name
 SS Regulus (T-AKR-292), an Algol class vehicle cargo ship
 SSM-N-8 Regulus, a cruise missile in service 1955-1964
 SSM-N-9 Regulus II, a cruise missile first produced in 1956
 Regulus (ship), a list of ships with the name
 Regulus missile submarines, a group of submarines operated by the United States Navy between 1959 and 1964
 USS Regulus, a list of ships with the name

Minerals
 Regulus, the metallic form of antimony
 Regulus, the end-product of metallic ore smelting
 Regulus, an alchemical symbol (variously 🜲, 🜳, 🜴, or 🜵) for the regulus-producing process

People
 Saint Regulus (4th century), Christian saint, purported to have brought the relics of St. Andrew to Scotland
 Marcus Atilius Regulus (consul 267 BC), a Roman consul
 Marcus Aquilius Regulus (c. 1st century AD), a Roman who is discussed in the works of Pliny the Younger

Other uses
 Regulus (1797 ship), a trading ship built in Spain and captured by the British
 Regulus (geometry) is the locus of lines meeting three given skew lines
 Regulus (video game)
 Regulus Grammar Compiler, a system for compiling unification grammars into grammars for speech recognition systems
 SS Regulus, a Canadian steamship

See also
 Marcus Atilius Regulus (disambiguation)